Kim Yu-gyeom (born November 17, 1997), known mononymously as Yugyeom, is a South Korean singer, songwriter and dancer who debuted as a member of Got7 in 2014 and one half of its duo subunit Jus2.

Early life
Despite being born in Seoul, Kim has spent a little of his childhood in Saudi Arabia due to his dad's job. He lived in Yeosu from age 6 to 11, then moved to Namyangju, Gyeonggi Province, where he grew up alongside his older brother.

While in Yeosu, he attended trumpet, bass and guitar lessons; however, he was especially interested in dance, and started performing for his classmates during lunch breaks in his second year of primary school. He started dreaming of becoming a singer and a dancer watching performances of Big Bang and J.Y. Park when he was little, and, after his family moved to Yeosu, Kim joined the school talent show, where he performed a choreography. From there, he actively took part in these events, and, for two years, learnt choreographies on his own by copying them from TV.

While attending the first year of middle school, he took part in the Hidden Performing Arts Tournament, where he danced to Beast's "Shock". His older brother filmed the performance and posted it to Cyworld, where the footage caught the attention of Kim's cousin, a dance teacher, who invited him to join the private dance school where she worked. After learning freestyle dance, he joined the Body & Soul crew at age 13, entering underground dance competitions: with them, in 2010, he won second place at the national competition Adrenaline House Dance Battle. A teacher at the dance school he was attending was a dance instructor for JYP Entertainment, and this led him to an audition for the label. He became a trainee in 2011, during his eighth year of school.

Career

2013–2020: Debut and solo activities
Trained under JYP Entertainment, he appeared on the 2013 Mnet reality-survival program WIN: Who Is Next, where he competed against YG Entertainment trainees, who later debuted as Winner and iKon members.

On January 16, 2014, Kim debuted with K-pop boy group Got7 releasing the EP Got It?. In 2015, JYP Entertainment in partnership with Youku Tudou, released a mini web drama series titled Dream Knight in which the drama featured the Got7 members as themselves. Over the years, he also took part in creating choreographies for "If You Do" from their EP Mad, and for "Poison" from their EP Dye.

In 2016, he participated in Mnet's Hit the Stage, a dance survival show which idols from different K-pop groups team up with professional dance teams to compete with others, appearing in episodes 9 and 10. He ranked second in episode 9 and won first place during the final. The same year, Kim began taking part in writing and composing Got7's songs, debuting as a songwriter with "See The Light" (빛이나) for their Flight Log: Departure album. Kim also co-hosted The Show on April 5 and The Show SBS Super Concert in Busan on October 18.

In April 2018, together with fellow member Jay B, he participated in the art collaboration project "Collaboran" for carbonated mineral water brand Perrier with American multimedia artist Ben Jones. The art collaboration was unveiled at a launching event on April 22, at Nakwon Musical Instrument Arcade. With Got7's third full-length studio album Present: You, Kim released his solo song "Fine". The accompanying music video was disclosed on September 12. In February 2019, he joined the SBS reality show Law of The Jungle in Northern Mariana Islands for four episodes. On March 5, he debuted as one half of the K-pop duo Jus2 alongside Jay B, as the second sub-unit of Got7, with the mini album Focus.

In May 2020, he appeared on MBC's singing competition show King of Mask Singer as "Mr. Raspberry Wine", on episode 257.

2021–present: Departure from JYPE and solo debut
In January 2021, Kim, along with the other group members, parted ways with JYP Entertainment though remaining as Got7. Rumors soon followed that Kim would join AOMG. It was then confirmed on February 19 that Kim had officially signed an exclusive contract with AOMG. A video of the singer dancing to "Franchise" by Travis Scott featuring Young Thug and M.I.A. was released on YouTube with the announcement.

On June 11, Kim released "I Want U Around" featuring DeVita. The single served as a pre-release of the 7-track extended play Point of View: U, for which he collaborated with hip-hop artists DeVita, Loco, Gray, Jay Park and Punchnello. The EP, which was released on June 17, saw Gray produce five songs and Cha Cha Malone two. A music video for "All Your Fault" was also released on the same day.

On June 22, 2021, Kim made his debut on the Billboard World Digital Song Sales Chart at number two with "I Want U Around". Two days later, the EP debuted on the Gaon Album Chart at number 11 and "All Your Fault" on the Gaon Download Chart at number 15.

In August, he performed at We All Are One, a cheering concert for the Tokyo Olympics, and at AOMG first online concert Above Ordinary 2021.

On March 31, 2022, Kim released the digital single "Take You Down" featuring Coogie. From May 5 to May 13, he embarked in a solo tour through Europe, performing in Berlin, Munich, Oberhausen, Paris and London, and selling out tickets for Munich and Oberhausen. He held a solo concert in Manila on August 19, debuting the unreleased track "Always Ready", and performed two sold out shows at Impact Exhibition Hall 5 in Bangkok on August 27 and 28.

On January 2, 2023, he released the digital single "Ponytail".

Personal life 
In February 2016, he graduated from Hanlim Multi Art School.

In June 2020, Kim donated an undisclosed amount to the Black Lives Matter Fund in light of the protests for George Floyd's murder.

Discography

Extended plays

Single albums

Singles

Other releases

Writing credits
All song credits are adapted from the Korea Music Copyright Association's database, unless otherwise noted.

Filmography

Dramas

Variety shows

Radio presenting

Music videos

Awards and nominations

Notes

References

External links

1997 births
Living people
People from Seoul
Singers from Seoul
Got7 members
JYP Entertainment artists
K-pop singers
South Korean male singers
South Korean male idols
Hanlim Multi Art School alumni